The Man in the Iron Mask is a 1985 Australian made-for-television animated adventure film directed by Geoff Collins and produced by Burbank Films Australia. It is based on Alexandre Dumas' 1847-1850 novel of the same name. It was written by Keith Dewhurst. The plot takes place years after The Three Musketeers (1986) – even though the latter animated film was released one year later – and it is known for a scene that displays a complex fireworks animation, as well for its bittersweet ending.

The film consists of 53 minutes in length and features the voices of Colin Friels as King Louis XIV, Gwen Plumb as Péronne and John Meillon in the role of Porthos. It was produced by Tim Brooke-Hunt and originally premiered on television. The Man in the Iron Mask is nowadays considered to be in the public domain.

Synopsis 
The three Musketeers have discovered, through D'Artagnan, the existence of Phillipe, a twin brother of Louis, the King of France. The hidden brother was separated from birth because of an old saying that twin princes would bring disaster (properly them fighting over who would inherit the crown). But one day, Phillipe discovers his origins and wants to find out everything about his heritage. But he gets thrown in the Bastille. Aramis helps him out by kidnapping Louis and letting Phillipe take his place. But the other musketeers discover what happened and let Louis out of prison. The twin brothers then meet face to face for the very first time. But Phillipe is punished by being imprisoned far away from France. And begin forced to wear an iron mask for the rest of his life.

References

External links
 

Australian animated feature films
Films based on The Vicomte of Bragelonne: Ten Years Later
1985 films
1980s Australian animated films
1985 animated films
1980s adventure films
Films set in the 1620s
Films set in France
Films set in Paris
Man in the Iron Mask
Twins in fiction
Television shows based on works by Alexandre Dumas
1980s English-language films
1980s Australian films